Sikhosiphi Rhadebe, also known as Bazooka, was an activist who was chairperson of the Amadiba Crisis Committee (ACC), an organisation campaigning against mining in Xolobeni in the Pondoland region of the Eastern Cape province of South Africa.

Death and aftermath
He was assassinated on 22 March 2016 when men posing as police shot him multiple times, and as of 2018 there were no arrests in his death. It has been claimed that the police sabotaged the investigation.

While mining has a history of violence in general, Perth-based Mineral Commodities Limited (MRC), a mining company planning to mine the area, denied any link to the murder.

See also
 List of unsolved murders
 Political assassinations in post-apartheid South Africa
 Political repression in post-apartheid South Africa

References

2016 murders in South Africa
March 2016 events in South Africa
Assassinated South African activists
Environmental killings
People murdered in South Africa
South African environmentalists
Unsolved murders in South Africa
Year of birth unknown